My Way to Olympia is a 2013 feature documentary produced and directed by Niko von Glasow, which follows disabled athletes preparing to compete at the London 2012 Paralympics. The film focuses on Matt Stutzman, an armless American archer; Norwegian table tennis player Aida Dahlen; the Rwandan sitting volleyball team; one-legged German swimmer Christiane Reppe and the tetraplegic Greek boccia player Greg Polychronidis. The film was produced by Palladio Film.

Release
The film premiered at the 2013 Berlin Film Festival and has been pre-nominated for the 2014 German Film Awards.

References

External links
 
 http://www.deutscher-filmpreis.de
 http://www.hollywoodreporter.com/review/my-way-olympia-berlin-review-422033

2013 films
2010s German-language films
Documentary films about sportspeople with disability
Films directed by Niko von Glasow
German documentary films
2012 Summer Paralympics
Documentary films about the Olympics
2013 documentary films
2010s German films